Herbert Whitmore Isaac (11 December 1899 – 26 April 1962) was an English cricketer who played three first-class games for Worcestershire in 1919 without any great success. None of these games were in the County Championship as Worcestershire did not re-enter this until the following season.

Isaac attended Harrow School, and played for them against Eton College in 1917.
In the 1920s and 1930s, he appeared a few times for Settlers v Officials in Kenyan minor matches.

His father, Arthur Isaac, had a more substantial career with Worcestershire, while his uncle John Isaac also played first-class cricket.

Notes

References
 
 

English cricketers
Worcestershire cricketers
People educated at Harrow School
1899 births
1962 deaths